The All-Ireland Senior Hurling Championship of 1993 was the 107th staging of Ireland's premier hurling knock-out competition. Kilkenny won the championship, beating Galway 2-17 to 1-15 in the final at Croke Park, Dublin.

The championship

Participating counties

Format

Leinster Championship
Quarter-finals: (2 matches) These are two lone matches between the first four teams drawn from the province of Leinster.  Two teams are eliminated at this stage, while two teams advance to the semi-finals.

Semi-finals: (2 matches) The winners of the two quarter-finals join the other two Leinster teams to make up the semi-final pairings.  Two teams are eliminated at this stage, while two teams advance to the final.

Final: (1 match) The winners of the two semi-finals contest this game.  One team is eliminated at this stage, while the winners advance to the All-Ireland semi-final.

Ulster Championship

Final: (1 match) This is a lone match between the two competing Ulster teams.  One team is eliminated at this stage, while the winners advance to the All-Ireland quarter-final.

Munster Championship
Quarter-finals: (2 matches) These are two lone matches between the first four teams drawn from the province of Munster.  Two teams are eliminated at this stage, while two teams advance to the semi-finals.

Semi-finals: (2 matches) The winners of the two quarter-finals join the other two Munster teams to make up the semi-final pairings.  Two teams are eliminated at this stage, while two teams advance to the final.

Final: (1 match) The winners of the two semi-finals contest this game.  One team is eliminated at this stage, while the winners advance to the All-Ireland semi-final.

All-Ireland Championship
Quarter-final: (1 match) This is a lone match between the Ulster champions and the All-Ireland 'B' champions.  One team is eliminated at this stage, while the winners advance to the All-Ireland semi-final where they play the Leinster champions.

Semi-finals: (2 matches) The Munster and Leinster champions will play the winners of the lone quarter-final and Galway.  The Munster and Leinster winners will be in opposite semi-finals.  Two teams are eliminated at this stage, while the two winnerss advance to the All-Ireland final.

Final: (1 match) The two semi-final winners will contest the All-Ireland final.

Leinster Senior Hurling Championship

Munster Senior Hurling Championship

Ulster Senior Hurling Championship

All-Ireland Senior Hurling Championship

Championship statistics

Scoring

First goal of the championship: Paul Flynn for Waterford against Kerry (Munster quarter-final)
Last goal of the championship: P. J. Delaney for Kilkenny against Galway (All-Ireland final)
Hat-trick heroes:
First hat-trick of the championship: Paul Flynn for Waterford against Kerry (Munster quarter-final)
Second hat-trick of the championship: Michael Cleary for Tipperary against Kerry (Munster semi-final)
Widest winning margin: 18 points
Kilkenny 5-19 : 0-16 Carlow (Leinster semi-final)
Tipperary 4-21 : 2-9 Kerry (Munster semi-final)
Tipperary 3-27 : 2-12 Clare (Munster final)
Kilkenny 4-18 : 1-9 Antrim (All-Ireland semi-final)
Most goals in a match: 7
Kerry 4-13 : 3-13 Waterford (Munster quarter-final)
Antrim 3-27 : 4-10 Meath (All-Ireland quarter-final)
Most points in a match: 39
Tipperary 3-27 : 2-12 Clare (Munster final)
Most goals by one team in a match: 5
Kilkenny 5-19 : 0-16 Carlow (Leinster semi-final)
Most goals scored by a losing team: 4
Meath 4-10 : 3-27 Antrim (All-Ireland quarter-final)
Most points scored by a losing team: 16
Carlow 0-16 : 5-19 Kilkenny (Leinster semi-final)

Miscellaneous

 At the All-Ireland quarter-final between Antrim and Meath an oversight on the part of officials meant that Amhrán na bhFiann was not played before the match.  It was claimed at the time that this was the first occasion that the national anthem was not played before an inter-county game.
 Kerry's defeat of Waterford in the Munster quarter-final was the team's first Munster championship victory since 1926.

Top scorers

Season

Single game

References
 Corry, Eoghan, The GAA Book of Lists (Hodder Headline Ireland, 2005).
 Donegan, Des, The Complete Handbook of Gaelic Games (DBA Publications Limited, 2005).

External links
All-Ireland Senior Hurling Championship 1993 Results

See also

1993
All-Ireland Senior Hurling Championship